UTC Derby Pride Park (formerly Derby Manufacturing UTC) is a 13–19 mixed university technical college in Pride Park, Derby, Derbyshire, England. It was established in September 2015 and is part of the Sheffield UTC Academy Trust. It specialises in engineering and life sciences.

History 
Derby Manufacturing UTC was established in September 2015 as a 14–19 mixed university technical college, with a specialism in engineering and manufacturing. Supported by Derby City Council, it was a partnership between Derby College, University of Derby, Rolls-Royce, Bombardier and Toyota. It was rated 'inadequate' and placed into special measures following its inspection by Ofsted in 2017, and despite two monitoring visits since, the college failed to improve its rating. In December 2019, it renamed to UTC Derby Pride Park and became part of the Sheffield UTC Academy Trust, with a specialism in engineering. The college maintained its original partners, and changed its entry age to 13 and added a second specialism of life sciences in September 2020.

References

External links 
 

University of Derby
Secondary schools in Derby
University Technical Colleges
Educational institutions established in 2015
2015 establishments in England